Kassidy Leigh Cook (born May 9, 1995) is an American diver.  Cook was a member of the United States national diving team in 2012. She missed out on competing in the Olympics by 0.4 points on June 23, 2012, but in 2016 she qualified for and competed in the 2016 Summer Olympics, placing 13th in the women's 3 metre springboard event.

Early life
Cook is the 5th child of Kevin and Laura Cook and lives in The Woodlands, Texas. She has five siblings: Kevin, Kara, Kelsey, Kylie and Kendall. Cook started diving at the age of four; her sister, Kara, was a diver at Purdue University.

Cook trains five hours a day, six days a week. She was a child model before she started diving. The National Interscholastic Swim Coaches Association (NISCA) named her the 2010 high school girls national champion in its diving All-American program.

She graduated from The Woodlands High School in 2013. Cook graduated from Stanford University in 2018.

Career

Personal life 
Cook is currently working as a recruiting coordinator at 23andMe after graduating from Stanford University.

References

American female divers
1995 births
Living people
Divers at the 2011 Pan American Games
Divers at the 2016 Summer Olympics
Olympic divers of the United States
Pan American Games medalists in diving
Pan American Games bronze medalists for the United States
Medalists at the 2011 Pan American Games
21st-century American women